Stephen "Steph" Carpenter (/ˈstɛfən/ STEF-ən; born August 3, 1970) is an American musician, known as the co-founder and a guitarist of the alternative metal band Deftones.

His guitar technique makes use of both ringing open strings and dissonant chord voicings, as well as stock power chords in polyrhythms. Carpenter began his musical career with Deftones playing the traditional six-string guitar. After becoming influenced by such bands as Fear Factory and Meshuggah, he began playing a seven-string guitar in the late 1990s. After Deftones' third album White Pony, subsequent releases would be written with seven-strings, until 2010's Diamond Eyes and 2012's Koi No Yokan, which were written with an eight-string guitar. Starting with 2020’s Ohms, songs have been written with nine-string guitars.
Carpenter was ranked 60th in Guitar World's The 100 Greatest Metal Guitarists poll.

Biography

Early life
Stephen Carpenter was born on August 3, 1970 in Sacramento, California, to an American father and a Mexican mother. He has a sister named Marci. He is first cousin to Testament singer Chuck Billy. He grew up in the Sacramento area and pursued many hobbies, including skateboarding.

When Carpenter was 15 years old, he was hit by a car while skateboarding. He used a wheelchair for several months. It was at this point that he began teaching himself guitar by playing along with the records of bands such as Anthrax, Stormtroopers of Death and Metallica. It has been reported that the driver paid Carpenter a cash settlement that allowed the band to purchase equipment, but drummer Abe Cunningham commented in an interview that this was "a myth about how our band was started."

Carpenter attended McClatchy High School with future bandmates Chino Moreno and Abe Cunningham. They were childhood friends and remained friends through the skateboarding scene in Sacramento. When Moreno found out Carpenter played guitar, he set up a jam session with Cunningham and the three began playing regularly in Carpenter's garage circa 1989.
After playing with several bassists, the band settled on Chi Cheng and within two years the band began playing club shows and later expanded their playing territory to San Francisco and Los Angeles where they played shows alongside bands such as Korn.

Personal life

His relationship with Deftones lead singer and bandmate Chino Moreno has been recorded as being fraught at times. Apparently, recording of Saturday Night Wrist was protracted due to their "warfare". With regards to musical tastes, Saturday Night Wrist being described as "more aggressive" equated to it being "more aggressive for him [Chino]"; Carpenter said he'd "definitely be glad to take it to the next level, but that's asking too much right now."

In November 2020, Carpenter revealed his belief in various conspiracy theories, including his belief that the Earth is flat and expressing anti-vaccination beliefs, among others. Commenting on this in 2021, Moreno suggested this may be related to Carpenter's cannabis smoking or being affected by his attendance of the Bataclan theatre shortly before the November 2015 Paris attacks.

Musical influences
Carpenter has stated that he mostly listens to hip hop, but outside of hip hop, Meshuggah, Fear Factory, Metallica, Slayer, Anthrax, and Faith No More are some of his influences. He has also stated that his favorite album of all time is Chaosphere by Meshuggah, saying: "The most brutal record I've heard, from second one to second last. It left me wondering where the hell I'd been the whole time." While recording Deftones' Diamond Eyes, he claimed that the only artist he listened to was American rapper Tech N9ne.

Other projects

Carpenter is a member of the underground instrumental project Sol Invicto, formed by producer Richie Londres alongside Technical Itch & Dan Foord. The band released its debut EP, Initium in 2011 for free. The band's second EP, Initium II was released in 2013 via the band's official SoundCloud page. The final installment of the Initium series was released late 2016. The group's music is only available to fans via their private mailing list "The Sol Invicto Comiti".

Carpenter was involved in the rap metal band Kush, featuring Christian Olde Wolbers and Raymond Herrera of Fear Factory and B-Real of Cypress Hill. The band's debut album, which was set to be released in 2003, was never released.

Carpenter also plays drums. In an interview with Guitar.com he reported that he likes drums more than he likes guitars, "as far as when it comes to creating the ideas." Also on his drumming abilities, he said:

Equipment

Carpenter currently endorses ESP Guitars, Marshall Amplifiers, Engl Amplifiers, GuitarRig and Fishman Fluence Signature pickups. He has been a major endorser of ESP since the mid-1990s with a number of signature six, seven, eight string and baritone models in production.

Carpenter currently uses Dunlop .011-.069 gauge strings. He also uses Dunlop 1 mm Tortex picks which are black with a custom logo. Carpenter's current rig consists of only a Fractal Audio Axe-FX II running straight into the venue's PA system. He also uses one or two Electro-Harmonix .22 Caliber pedals to power his monitors.

Discography

With Deftones

 Adrenaline (1995, Maverick/Warner Bros.)
 Around the Fur (1997, Maverick/Warner Bros.)
 White Pony (2000, Maverick)
 Deftones (2003, Maverick)
 Saturday Night Wrist (2006, Maverick)
 Eros (recorded 2008, unreleased)
 Diamond Eyes (2010, Warner Bros./Reprise)
 Koi No Yokan (2012, Warner Bros./Reprise Records)
 Gore (2016, Warner Bros./Reprise Records)
 Ohms (2020, Warner Bros./Reprise Records)

With Sol Invicto
 Unidose (Single)  (2008)
 Carrion (Single)  (2008)
 Initium I (2011)
 Initium II (2013)
 Initium III (2016)
 Initium White Label Album (2017) (Sol Invicto Comiti)
 Diamond Eyes (Official Remix) 2010 Warner Bros. Records
 You've Seen The Butcher (Official Remix) 2010 Warner Bros. Records
 Morte Et Dabo (Sol Invicto Remix) (2011, Sumerian Records)
 A Lesson Never Learned (Sol Invicto Remix) (2011, Sumerian Records)

Guest appearances
"Savory" – from Soon by Far (1997)
"Rizzo" – from Pass Out of Existence by Chimaira (2001)
"The C.I.A. is Still Trying to Kill Me" – from The Future Is Now by Non Phixion (2002)
"By_Myslf" – from Reanimation by Linkin Park (2002)
I'd Start a Revolution (If I Could Get Up in the Morning) by Aimee Allen (2003)
Blue-Sky Research by Taproot (2005)
"If I Could" – from All 6's and 7's by Tech N9ne (2011)
"El Sol" - from Muerte by Will Haven (2018)
"I Once Breathed" - from  Bloodlands by Truth Corroded (2019)

References

External links

Carpenter's 2000 Deftones Guitar Rig. GuitarGeek.Com
Carpenter's 2011 Deftones Guitar Rig. GuitarGeek.Com.
Carpenter's 2011 Deftones Pedalboard Diagram. GuitarChalk.com

1970 births
Sol Invicto members
Living people
American multi-instrumentalists
Deftones members
Musicians from Sacramento, California
Seven-string guitarists
Eight-string guitarists
American heavy metal guitarists
Alternative metal guitarists
American musicians of Mexican descent
Hispanic and Latino American musicians
Flat Earth proponents